Best Friends are a professional wrestling stable, originally a tag team consisting of Chuck Taylor and Trent Beretta. The team is currently performing in All Elite Wrestling (AEW). They first formed in Pro Wrestling Guerilla (PWG), where they were the winners of the 2014 Dynamite Duumvirate Tag Team Title Tournament.

Since the inception of AEW in 2019, the duo has regularly appeared alongside Orange Cassidy. Starting in 2021, they would be joined by Kris Statlander and Wheeler Yuta, the latter of whom left the team in 2022, and would be replaced by Danhausen later in the year. Occasional appearances have been made by Trent's Roppongi Vice tag team partner Rocky Romero, and by Sue (Trent's real-life mother). The group is the AEW branch of the NJPW faction Chaos, as the two organizations have a working relationship.

The original team of Taylor and Trent are often seen as a comedy tag team, with Trent often acting as the straight man to the more eccentric Taylor as well as Sue's use of her Honda Odyssey.

History

Pro Wrestling Guerilla (2013–2019)
Chuck Taylor and Trent? first teamed on August 31, 2013 at the Pro Wrestling Guerilla (PWG) 2013 Battle of Los Angeles alongside Joey Ryan, where they defeated the team of B-Boy, Tommaso Ciampa, and Willie Mack. A string of victories followed, culminating in Taylor and Trent? defeating The Inner City Machine Guns to win the 2014 Dynamite Duumvirate Tag Team Title Tournament on January 31. They subsequently lost a match against The Young Bucks for the PWG World Tag Team Championship at Mystery Vortex II on March 28, 2014.

Ring of Honor (2017–2019)

Best Friends first appeared in Ring of Honor (ROH) on May 14, 2017, joined by Beretta's Roppongi Vice partner Rocky Romero, in a victory over Bullet Club's The Young Bucks and Adam Page. On October 10, Chuckie T and Beretta won a match against The Addiction to become number one contenders to the ROH World Tag Team Championship, but lost to defending champions The Motor City Machine Guns at Final Battle on December 15.

New Japan Pro-Wrestling (2017–2019)

Best Friends made their debut for New Japan Pro-Wrestling (NJPW) on the second day of the 2017 World Tag League on November 19, representing the CHAOS stable. They went on to score four wins and three losses in the tournament, failing to advance to the finals. They competed in the 2018 World Tag League as well, scoring 14 points and thus failing to advance to the finals. During the tournament, Chuckie displayed a much more aggressive attitude, attacking his opponents with steel chairs which often caused a disqualification loss for the team and caused tension to built between him and Beretta.

Ultimately, this storyline never developed further, as they both left NJPW and signed with upstart All Elite Wrestling in the beginning of 2019. On February 7, 2019, their profiles were removed from NJPW website.

As a result of NJPW's partnership with All Elite Wrestling, Rocky Romero invited the entire Best Friends stable (now consisting of five members) to be part of CHAOS, which they accepted.

All Elite Wrestling (2019–present)
On February 7, 2019, Best Friends appeared at an All Elite Wrestling (AEW) rally in Las Vegas and announced that they were joining AEW. The duo participated in the AEW World Tag Team Title Tournament to crown the inaugural champions, but were eliminated in the first round. During this time they also became friends with and added Orange Cassidy to the team, including adding him to their trademark hug and zoom out.  On the October 30, 2019, episode of Dynamite, Best Friends and their newfound ally Orange Cassidy dressed up as Rick and Morty before they won in a 6-man tag-team match against Alex Reynolds, John Silver, and Q. T. Marshall. At Bash at the Beach on January 15, 2020, Best Friends competed in a four-way tag team match to determine the number one contenders for the AEW World Tag Team Championship, which was won by "Hangman" Adam Page and Kenny Omega. At the Double or Nothing Buy-In, Best Friends defeated Private Party (Isiah Kassidy & Marq Quen) in a number one contender's match for the AEW World Tag Team Championship after delivering the Strong Zero on Quen. On the June 10th edition of Dynamite, Best Friends and Orange Cassidy defeated The Inner Circle's Jake Hager and Santana and Ortiz in a 6-man tag team match, after which they suffered a beatdown from the rest of The Inner Circle, with Orange Cassidy suffering the worst beating after Chris Jericho hit him with a bag of blood oranges. Best Friends would seek revenge against Chris Jericho and Sammy Guevara (Le Sex Gods) while putting their tag team title #1 contendership on the line on the June 17th edition of Dynamite. They emerged victorious after Guevara tripped over the cameraman's hand which enabled Trent to pick up the victory for the team. The cameraman who was at ringside turned out to be Orange Cassidy who then proceeded to beat down Jericho. Best Friends would receive their tag team title shot against Kenny Omega and "Hangman" Adam Page at Fyter Fest night 1, which they lost.

In late August, while Cassidy resumed his feud with Chris Jericho, Trent and Chuck started feuding with Santana and Ortiz after (Trent's Mom) Sue's van was destroyed by Santana and Ortiz, leading to a match on an episode of Dynamite.

In April 2021, Trent would take time off to receive spinal fusion surgery. In his absence, the group recruited Wheeler Yuta, taking him under their wing as a young lion, and later, Danhausen initially became an associate before going on to become an official member of the group on the February 22, 2023 edition of AEW Dynamite by sporting his own tracksuit. Trent returned in December, and friction began to form between the two throughout early 2022, with Trent antagonizing Yuta in backstage segments and supplementary material. At the same time, Bryan Danielson, while floating the idea of a stable with Jon Moxley, made overtures towards Yuta by naming him as a potential understudy. On March 16, 2022, Yuta and Taylor lost a tag team match to Danielson and Moxley, now led and managed by William Regal, but after the match, a spurned Yuta would return to the ring and offer a handshake to Regal. Regal would instead slap him, causing Yuta to confront him immediately afterwards, impressing Regal. On the March 30 and April 8 episodes of Dynamite and Rampage respectively, Yuta would lose to the newly christened Blackpool Combat Club in increasingly competitive matches, with the latter match with Moxley finally resulting in Regal offering a bloodied Yuta a handshake, which he accepted, before painting "BCC" on his chest with his blood, signifying his departure from Best Friends and CHAOS and initiation into BCC.

Championships and accomplishments 
 All Elite Wrestling
AEW International Championship (1 time, current, inaugural) - Cassidy
AEW All-Atlantic Championship (1 time, final) - Cassidy
 2023 Casino Tag Team Royale - Cassidy and Danhausen
Dynamite Award (1 time)
Hardest Moment to Clean Up After (2021) - (Best Friends vs Santana and Ortiz) - Dynamite (September 16)
 Pro Wrestling Guerrilla
 Dynamite Duumvirate Tag Team Title Tournament (2014) - Trent and Taylor
 Pro Wrestling Illustrated
 Most Popular Wrestler of the Year (2020) - Cassidy
DDT Pro-Wrestling
Ironman Heavymetalweight Championship (1 time) - Cassidy
Revolution Eastern Wrestling
REW 24/7 Championship (1 time) - Cassidy
Best Gimmick (2020) - Cassidy 
Ring of Honor
 ROH Pure Championship (1 time) – Yuta

See also
Roppongi Vice

References

External links

All Elite Wrestling teams and stables
Chaos (professional wrestling) members
New Japan Pro-Wrestling teams and stables
Ring of Honor teams and stables